The Río Hondo (Bayamón, Puerto Rico) is a river of Puerto Rico.

The river lends its name to a neighborhood, the Rio Hondo neighborhood, or "Urbanizacion Rio Hondo", also in Bayamón, and to the neighborhood's mall, Plaza Rio Hondo (Plaza Rio Hondo).

See also
List of rivers of Puerto Rico

References

External links
 USGS Hydrologic Unit Map – Caribbean Region (1974)
Rios de Puerto Rico

Rivers of Puerto Rico